Richard Geoghegan may refer to:

 Richard H. Geoghegan (1866–1943), British philologist and Esperantist
 Richard Geoghegan (Galway) (1717–1800), Irish agriculturist